Porcsalma is a village in Szabolcs-Szatmár-Bereg county, in the Northern Great Plain region of eastern Hungary.

Geography

Sources
 Szatmár vármegye in Magyarország vármegyéi és városai: Magyarország monografiája. A magyar korona országai történetének, földrajzi, képzőművészeti, néprajzi, hadügyi és természeti viszonyainak, közművelődési és közgazdasági állapotának encziklopédiája. Szerk. Borovszky Samu. Budapest: Országos Monografia Társaság. 1908.
 Magyar néprajzi lexikon

Porcsalma